Catasetum luridum, the pale-yellow catasetum, is a species of orchid. It is native to South America, where it is distributed from Guyana to Brazil.

References

luridum
Orchids of South America
Orchids of Brazil
Orchids of Guyana